Belton with Browston is a civil parish in the English county of Norfolk. Historically part of Suffolk, the parish consists of the villages of Belton and Browston Green, and is situated some 5 miles (8 km) south-west of the town of Great Yarmouth and 6 miles (10 km) north-west of the Suffolk town of Lowestoft.

The civil parish has an area of 3.23 square miles (8.36 square km) and in the 2001 census had a population of 4,098 in 1,589 households, the population reducing to 3,805 at the 2011 Census. For the purposes of local government, the parish today falls within the district of Great Yarmouth. However prior to the Local Government Act 1972, the parish was within Lothingland Rural District in Suffolk. It is connected to Yarmouth by bus services 6B and 7 and to Norwich by the X11 service, operated by First Norfolk & Suffolk.

History
The earliest evidence of human inhabitation is a flint axehead from the Palaeolithic period. The fort at nearby Burgh Castle along with finds of coins and pottery indicate that the area was inhabited throughout the Roman Britain period.

Belton (as Beletun) and Browston (as Brockestuna) are both mentioned in Domesday book, published after the Norman Invasion of 1066. The population was probably around 50–60 in each of the villages.

During the medieval period, Belton and Browston were essentially agricultural communities and evidence has indicated that Browston could have been the larger of the two during this time. There is no mention of a church in Belton at the time of Domesday book. The earliest record of the church is in the time of Henry I who ruled from 1100 to 1135. Judging by architectural style, the current church building dates form the 1300s with major restoration work taking place from 1837 Rev Revd Francis Howes and his family. The tower was rebuilt in 1849.

Belton was affected by the Great Plague of 1665, even though it is associated with London. The parish register lists 13 burials with 7 listed as "plague". At the time, three or four burials a year was normal.

Belton continued as a small farming community and in 1858,  Belton Station was opened, giving the village a railway link to Great Yarmouth and London. This helped the local farming industry as Belton became a market garden providing to markets in nearby Yarmouth and as far as London.

Belton at war 
Belton Common was used by the Suffolk Regiment for military and training purposes during World War I. As German U-Boats disrupted imports, Belton was used to grow produce with various schemes such as growing potatoes in allotments and gardens.

During World War II the Royal Norfolk Regiment were billeted in Belton with many local people sharing their homes with the soldiers. Belton's most famous incident of the war was when American B-24 Liberator bomber "Belle of the East" crash landed near Sandy Lane. The crew survived the crash and were aided by the villagers.  A plaque on the Tavern pub commemorates the incident with a nearby street bearing the name "Belle of the East Way".

Belton hosted evacuees from Romford, Essex and a few settled in the village. Belton experienced at least one air raid with around two thousand bombs being dropped mostly on the village common.

Post war 
After 1950 the population of the village increased greatly, especially during the rapid expansion of the 1970s. On 26 September 1990 the parish was renamed from "Belton" to "Belton with Browston".

Notable residents
 Sir John Mills — Actor. Spent his early years in Belton as his father was the headmaster of the village school. He recalled on Desert Island Discs many years later that his first public performance was in a concert in the village institute organised by his father.
 Jessica-Jane Applegate - Paralympic swimmer. A gold postbox close to the Tavern pub in the village recognises her Paralympic Gold in 2012.

War Memorial
Belton's war memorial takes the form of two plaques located inside Belton Church. The following names are listed for the First World War:
 Corporal Alfred J. Arrowsmith (1886-1918), 7th Battalion, Royal Norfolk Regiment
 Private James H. Sharman (d.1918), 6th Battalion, Leinster Regiment
 Private Walter E. Young (1894-1917), 27th Battalion, Machine Gun Corps
 Private Robert W. Fuller (d.1916), 2nd Battalion, Suffolk Regiment
 Private Ernest C. Brooks (1892-1916), 9th Battalion, Suffolk Regiment
 Private George A. Saul (d.1918), 1st Battalion, Queen's Own Royal West Kent Regiment
 Trimmer F. Robert Newark (1893-1915), HM Drifter Frons Olivae

See also
 Moorlands C of E Primary Academy

References

 Ordnance Survey (2005). OS Explorer Map OL40 - The Broads. .
 Office for National Statistics & Norfolk County Council (2001). Census population and household counts for unparished urban areas and all parishes. Retrieved 2 December 2005.
 Local Government Act 1972, Schedule 1 Part II Non-metropolitan counties. The illustrator A Hards resides in Browston.

External links
All Saints on the European Round Tower Churches Website
 for Belton.
 for Browston Green.

Civil parishes in Norfolk
Borough of Great Yarmouth